The 1916 Calgary municipal election took place on December 11, 1916 to elect a Mayor to a one-year term and six Aldermen on a two-year term, and two Aldermen for a one-year term, to sit on the thirty-second Calgary City Council. In addition, a Commissioner, four members for the Public School Board, three members for the Separate School Board, two plebiscites on single transferable vote and Daylight Savings were both on the ballot.

The seven elected Aldermen joined Aldermen Samuel Hunter Adams, Robert Colin Marshall, John McNeill, Thomas John Searle Skinner, and George Frederick Tull who were previously elected for two-year terms in 1915 to Calgary City Council.

Background
The election was held under multiple non-transferable vote where each elector was able to cast a ballot for the mayor, commissioner and six ballots for Aldermen who were elected at-large with the city as one large district.

Extension of voting franchise to all residents male or female who are British subjects 21 years of age who have been residents of the city for six months prior to June 1 of the year of a municipal election. This was the first election in Calgary under full franchise.

A one-year Alderman position was opened on Council following Adoniram Judson Samis' resignation to run for Commissioner. The six candidates with the most votes were elected to two year terms, while the next two highest candidates were elected to a single year term.

Mayor Costello and Commissioner Graves were acclaimed upon the close of nominations on December 7, 1915.

Results

Mayor

Commissioner

Councillors

School board trustee

Public school board

Separate school board
James Sullivan - Acclaimed
Peter Collins - Acclaimed
Francis Joseph Conroy - Acclaimed

Plebiscite

Proportional representation
Future municipal elections conducted with single transferable vote.
For - 3,223
Against - 1,383

Daylight savings
Daylight savings time.
For - 1,207
Against - 3,141

See also
List of Calgary municipal elections

References

Politics of Calgary
Municipal elections in Calgary
1916 elections in Canada
1910s in Calgary